The 31st Golden Globe Awards, honoring the best in film and television for 1973, were held on January 26, 1974.

Winners and nominees

Film

Television

Best Series - Drama
 The Waltons
Cannon
Columbo
Hawkins
Mannix
Police Story

Best Series - Comedy or Musical 
 All in the Family
The Carol Burnett Show
The Mary Tyler Moore Show
Sanford and Son
The Sonny & Cher Comedy Hour

Best Actor - Drama Series
 James Stewart – Hawkins
David Carradine – Kung Fu
Mike Connors – Mannix
Peter Falk – Columbo
Richard Thomas – The Waltons
Robert Young – Marcus Welby, M.D.

Best Actress - Drama Series
 Lee Remick – The Blue Knight
Michael Learned – The Waltons
Julie London – Emergency!
Emily McLaughlin – General Hospital
Susan Saint James – McMillan & Wife

Best Actor - Comedy or Musical Series
 Jack Klugman – The Odd Couple
Alan Alda – M*A*S*H
Dom DeLuise – Lotsa Luck
Redd Foxx – Sanford and Son
Carroll O'Connor – All in the Family

Best Actress - Comedy or Musical Series
 Cher – The Sonny & Cher Comedy Hour
 Jean Stapleton – All In the Family
Beatrice Arthur – Maude
Carol Burnett – The Carol Burnett Show
Mary Tyler Moore – The Mary Tyler Moore Show

Best Supporting Actor
 McLean Stevenson – M*A*S*H
Edward Asner – The Mary Tyler Moore Show
Will Geer – The Waltons
Harvey Korman – The Carol Burnett Show
Strother Martin – Hawkins
Rob Reiner – All in the Family

Best Supporting Actress
 Ellen Corby – The Waltons
Gail Fisher – Mannix
Valerie Harper – The Mary Tyler Moore Show
Sally Struthers – All in the Family
Loretta Swit – M*A*S*H

References
IMdb 1974 Golden Globe Awards

031
1973 film awards
1973 television awards
January 1974 events in the United States
1974 awards in the United States